Arif Khan (born 5 June 2001) is an Afghan cricketer. He made his List A debut for Band-e-Amir Region in the 2017 Ghazi Amanullah Khan Regional One Day Tournament on 10 August 2017. He made his Twenty20 debut for Band-e-Amir Dragons in the 2017 Shpageeza Cricket League on 17 September 2017. He made his first-class debut for Speen Ghar Region in the 2017–18 Ahmad Shah Abdali 4-day Tournament on 7 November 2017.

References

External links
 

2001 births
Living people
Afghan cricketers
Band-e-Amir Dragons cricketers
Kabul Eagles cricketers
Spin Ghar Tigers cricketers
Place of birth missing (living people)